Sergei Terehhov (born 18 April 1975) is an Estonian football coach and former professional player. He is currently the manager of Narva Trans.

Club career
His former clubs include Tervis Pärnu, Pärnu Kalev, Tallinna Sadam, Flora Tallinn, Brann, Haka, Shinnik Yaroslavl, Honka, TVMK Tallinn and Nõmme Kalju.

International career
Terehhov was a long-time Estonia national football team player with 94 caps to his name. He scored the equaliser when Estonia played 1–1 against Russia in World Cup 2006 qualifications.

Managerial career
Terehhov was officially appointed as a manager at his former club Nõmme Kalju on 10 December 2014.

From 2023, Terehhov is the head coach of Narva Trans.

Honours

Club
 Nõmme Kalju
 Estonian Cup runners-up: 2008–09
 Meistriliiga: 2012
 Haka
 Finnish Cup: 2002
 Veikkausliiga: 2004

Individual
 Estonian Silverball: 1998

References

External links
 Nõmme Kalju profile
 

1975 births
Living people
Sportspeople from Pärnu
Estonian footballers
Estonia international footballers
Estonian people of Russian descent
Veikkausliiga players
FC Flora players
FC TVMK players
FC Shinnik Yaroslavl players
FC Haka players
FC Honka players
Nõmme Kalju FC players
Estonian expatriate footballers
Expatriate footballers in Norway
Estonian expatriate sportspeople in Norway
Expatriate footballers in Russia
Estonian expatriate sportspeople in Russia
Expatriate footballers in Finland
Estonian expatriate sportspeople in Finland
Eliteserien players
Russian Premier League players
SK Brann players
Estonian football managers
Association football midfielders